Antoine Payen may refer to:

 Antoine Payen the Younger (1792–1853), Belgian painter and naturalist
 Antoine Payen the Elder (1748–1798), Belgian architect
 Antoine Payen (animator) (1902–1985), French animator